Emerald Academy is a higher secondary school in Sagarmatha Chowk, Bhadrapur, Jhapa, Nepal. Emerald Academy was originally established as a secondary school, and now it has expanded to higher secondary school and also has a separate wing of college for undergraduate studies.

The main building was used for kindergarten, junior education, and various activities such as music, sports, and assemblies. Emerald Academy also opened a branch in Ekantakuna Lalitpur. This branch included only one building until 2003, when Emerald Academy purchased another building across the road. This second branch was used for secondary education.

At one point in its history, Emerald Academy collapsed due to financial issues. However, after massive investment in infrastructures and new faculties, it recovered.

The institution recently opened a new branch of Montessori Kindergarten in New Baneshor, Kathmandu. Bhadrapur's Emerald Academy is currently undergoing expansion. The school has completed construction.

References

 http://topnepal.com/nepal/jhapa/page/development-education
 http://www.nalibeli.org/eng/index.php/Affiliated_Colleges_in_Ilam,_Jhapa,_Khotang,_Morang,_Dhankuta_and_Okhaldhunga
 https://www.collegenp.com/college/emerald-academy-and-college-jhapa/
 https://edusanjal.com/college/emerald-academy-college/
 https://kpadhne.com/institutions/emerald-academy-college
 http://www.educatenepal.com/institutions/detail/emerald-academy-bhadrapur-jhapa
 https://www.nepalyp.com/company/41008/Emerald_Academy_Higher_Secondary_School

1986 establishments in Nepal
Schools in Nepal